Thomas Coyle (born 10 May 1988) is an English rugby league footballer with Hunslet Hawks. He is a scrum half.

Coyle was educated at St. John Fisher Catholic High School, Wigan. He signed for the Wigan Warriors from the local amateur team Wigan St Patricks. He moved into the Wigan Academy Under 18s in 2005.

Coyle was selected for Lancashire U17s and England U15s and U16s while part of the Wigan scholarship and Academy systems. He was also included in the England U17s squad to take on the touring Australian Institute of Sport in 2005. He signed for Halifax on loan in May, but having failed to impress was released early.

Coyle's father, Bernard Coyle, and grandfather, also Bernard Coyle, both played for Wigan at scrum-half in the 1970s and 1940s respectively. His elder brother, James, is a former Wigan Academy scrum half .

References

External links
(archived by web.archive.org) Widnes Vikings profile
Wigan Warriors profile
(archived by web.archive.org) Oldham R.L.F.C. profile
CherryandWhite profile
(archived by web.archive.org) Wigan Warriors photo

1988 births
Living people
English rugby league players
Halifax R.L.F.C. players
Hunslet R.L.F.C. players
Leigh Leopards players
Oldham R.L.F.C. players
Rugby league halfbacks
Rugby league hookers
Rugby league players from Wigan
Swinton Lions players
Whitehaven R.L.F.C. players
Widnes Vikings players
Wigan St Patricks players
Wigan Warriors players